The Big Run Baptist Church and Cemetery, also known as Franklin Township Historical Society, is a historic Baptist church and cemetery located at 6510 South Franklin Road in Franklin Township, Marion County, Indiana.  The church was built in 1871 as a Baptist meeting house and served the church congregation until 1977. It is a one-story, gable front brick building with Italianate style design elements. The associated cemetery was established in 1854, with one stone dated to 1841.  The most recent burial was in 1986.  Also on the property is a contributing privy constructed about 1920. The Franklin Township Historical Society acquired the property and now uses the building as a historical museum.

It was added to the National Register of Historic Places in 2005.

References

External links
 Franklin Township Historical Society
 

Baptist churches in Indiana
Churches on the National Register of Historic Places in Indiana
Cemeteries on the National Register of Historic Places in Indiana
Churches completed in 1871
Italianate architecture in Indiana
Churches in Indianapolis
National Register of Historic Places in Marion County, Indiana
National Register of Historic Places in Indianapolis
Italianate church buildings in the United States